The Nechit is a right tributary of the river Bistrița in Romania. It discharges into the Bistrița in Ruseni.

Tributaries

The following rivers are tributaries to the river Nechit (from source to mouth):

Left: Mastacăn
Right: Cracul Comarnic, Borchiz, Alunul, Durașu, Stroe, Hugiu, Varnițele, Coșu and Nechizel

References

Rivers of Romania
Rivers of Neamț County